The 1918 Camp Upton football team represented the United States Army stationed at Camp Upton in Yaphank on Long Island, New York, during the 1918 college football season. Former Princeton halfback Frank Glick was in charge of athletics at the camp before being transferred in November 1918.  He was then replaced in that position by boxing champion Benny Leonard.

Schedule

References

Camp Upton
Camp Upton football